Gliese 777 c, often catalogued as Gliese 777 Ac or simply HD 190360 c, is an extrasolar planet approximately 52 light-years away in the constellation of Cygnus.  The planet was discovered orbiting the primary star of the Gliese 777 system in 2005 using the radial velocity method and confirmed in 2009.  The planet was once called the "smallest extrasolar planet discovered", but this is currently no longer the case.  With a minimum mass just 18 times that of the Earth, the planet is likely a "hot Neptune" planet, a small Jovian planet, or possibly a large terrestrial planet (a super-Earth).

See also 
 Gliese 436 b
 Gliese 876 b
 MOA-2007-BLG-192Lb

References

External links 
 

Cygnus (constellation)
Exoplanets discovered in 2005
Giant planets
Exoplanets detected by radial velocity
Hot Neptunes
7

de:Gliese 777#Gliese 777 Ac